Rushes Postproduction was a post-production and visual effects company based in London. Rushes closed down in December 2017. 

It had a worldwide reputation for producing commercial and pop-promo projects.  The company was formed in 1977 and its staff spawned many successful spin-offs, including The Foundry, Main Frame, Nice Biscuits and Smoke & Mirrors.  Rushes was bought by Richard Branson in 1987 and sold to Liberty Livewire (rebranded Ascent Media Group) by the Virgin Group in 2000.

The company famously posted Dire Straits' "Money for Nothing"; the first video ever to be played on MTV Europe and the launch advert for the Ford Puma featuring a composited late Steve McQueen.

The company was the first in the UK to acquire a Rank-Cintel URSA (replaced with a Thomson Spirit) and a C-Reality Telecine as well as being the first to adopt a Discreet (now an Autodesk subsidiary) Flame SGI based compositing suite.

In 2006, Rushes became a fully HD capable facility from Telecine through visual effects and 3D. One of the first HD projects was the rebranding of ITV 3 in January 2006.

Rushes posted pop-promos for many well known bands including Arctic Monkeys, Dido, Faithless, Gorillaz, Ian Brown, Manic Street Preachers, New Order, Scissor Sisters, The Streets, Oasis, Placebo, Red Hot Chili Peppers, and Snow Patrol.

In 2009, Rushes was nominated for a Primetime Emmy Award for its visual effects work on Discovery's series, Human Body: Pushing the Limits.

The company was acquired by the Deluxe Entertainment Services Group in January 2011.

Deluxe Entertainment Services then subsequently decided to close down the 40-year-old Post House in December 2017.

Recent film/long-form projects
 2008 – RocknRolla
 2008 – Hellboy II: The Golden Army
 2008 – Human Body: Pushing the Limits
 2007 – Stardust
 2007 – 28 Weeks Later
 2006 – Mischief Night
 2006 – Red Road – Winner of Cannes Film Festival Prix du Jury
 2005 – Rome
 2004 – King Arthur
 2004 – Around the World in 80 Days
 1998 – Lost in Space
 1997 – Tomorrow Never Dies

Notable commercials/pop-promos
Commercials or pop-promos that Rushes worked on and were popular or groundbreaking for their time:

2000s
 2006 – Gorillaz "El Manana"
 2004 – The Streets "Fit But You Know It"
 2003 – Land Rover "Gator"
 2002 – Smirnofff  "Trainer"
 2001 – Charmin "Bear"
 2000 – Schweppes "Fancy Dress"
 2000 – Kylie "Spinning Around"

1990s
 1999 – EastEnders opening title sequence 
 1999 – Moloko "Sing It Back"
 1998 – Ford Cougar "Easy Driver"
 1998 – Aphex Twin "Windowlicker"
 1997 – Ford Puma "McQueen"

1980s
 1985 – Dire Straits "Money For Nothing"

Independent articles
 BBC Showcase
 Classic Animation
 Fluid simulation
 Massive adoption

Soho Shorts Film Festival
Each summer, Rushes hosted the Rushes Soho Shorts Film Festival.

References

External links
 www.rushes.co.uk
 www.sohoshorts.co.uk
 Discovery Channel Human Body

Mass media companies established in 1977
Television and film post-production companies
Visual effects companies
Companies based in the City of Westminster
1977 establishments in England
2017 disestablishments in England